The BC Winter Games are an amateur sporting event held in British Columbia, Canada on every other (even-numbered) year.

The next BC Winter Games are scheduled to be held in Greater Vernon, BC from March 23 to 26, 2023.

History 

The BC Games date back to 1978 when the first Winter Games were hosted at Penticton, British Columbia. The Games would continue and be hosted every year until 1997, when it was changed to every second year along with the BC Summer Games.

Broadcast 
In January 2016 it was announced that viaSport would be producing a daily three-minute video for the duration of the games for the 2016 year.

Sponsored sports 
The BC Winter Games brings both able-bodied and disabled sports to one grand event all in the name of sport and competition. The top three participants/teams of each sport receive a medal in an Olympic fashion.

While not all of the winter-related sports can be in the BC Winter Games, there is an application process for games that feel they have grown large enough in British Columbia to be a part of the Games.

Current winter sports

See also
Canada Games
Canada Summer Games
Canada Winter Games
Western Canada Summer Games
BC Games
BC Summer Games
Alberta Winter Games
Saskatchewan Games
Manitoba Games
Ontario Games
Quebec Games

External links
BC Games Society - official site

References

Winter
Winter multi-sport events
1978 establishments in British Columbia